Benjamin Clark House is located in Deptford Township in Gloucester County, New Jersey. The house was built in 1769 and was added to the National Register of Historic Places on January 25, 1973.

See also
National Register of Historic Places listings in Gloucester County, New Jersey

References

External links
"Benjamin Clark House" at PrincetonHistory.org

Deptford Township, New Jersey
Houses on the National Register of Historic Places in New Jersey
Georgian architecture in New Jersey
Federal architecture in New Jersey
Houses completed in 1769
Houses in Gloucester County, New Jersey
National Register of Historic Places in Gloucester County, New Jersey
New Jersey Register of Historic Places